Pozharsky (masculine), Pozharskaya (feminine), or Pozharskoye (neuter) may refer to:
Dmitry Pozharsky (1578–1642), Rurikid prince who helped bring the Time of Troubles to an end
Ivan Pozharsky (died 1938), Soviet military commissar, Hero of the Soviet Union
Semyon Pozharsky (died 1659), Rurikid prince and military commander
Pozharsky District, a district of Primorsky Krai, Russia
Pozharsky (inhabited locality) (Pozharskaya, Pozharskoye), name of several rural localities in Russia
Pozharsky cutlet, Russian meat dish

Russian-language surnames